McEldowney is a surname. Notable people with the surname include:

Brooke McEldowney, the creator of 9 Chickweed Lane, a print comic strip, and of Pibgorn, a webcomic
Dennis McEldowney (1926–2003), New Zealand born author and publisher
Francis McEldowney (born 1981), Irish Gaelic footballer who plays for Derry, with whom he has won a National League title
Harrison McEldowney American choreographer known for his theatrical work
John McEldowney, Professor of Law at the University of Warwick and former World Bank visiting Fellow in the Supreme Tribunal of Justice in Venezuela
Nancy McEldowney (born 1958), United States career diplomat